This is a list of seasons completed by the Montana Grizzlies football team of the National Collegiate Athletic Association (NCAA) Division I Football Championship Subdivision (FCS). Since the team's creation in 1893, the Grizzlies have participated in more than 1,100 officially sanctioned games.

Seasons

References

Montana

Montana Grizzlies football seasons